Martinsrieth is a village and a former municipality in the Mansfeld-Südharz district, Saxony-Anhalt, Germany. Since 1 July 2009, it is part of the municipality Wallhausen.

Former municipalities in Saxony-Anhalt
Mansfeld-Südharz